The Winner Is is an American vocal game show which aired on NBC. Hosted by Nick Lachey, the seven-episode series featured singers of all ages competing for a chance to win $1,000,000. The show premiered on June 10, 2013.

The winner of the series was Katie Ohh, a nurse who won by a 57–44 decision from the 101 expert judges. For her final song, she sang "The Climb". The runner-up was Sharde Bivans, a teacher, who performed "It's a Man's Man's Man's World". The other four finalists in the Final 6 were the performers Amy Showalter, Leah Grace, and the vocal groups Senior Sounds of Touch and The LaFontaines.

With a dismal 1.0 rating/3 share among adults 18–49, NBC announced its immediate cancellation on August 6, 2013, with two episodes remaining.

Format
In the first round, six contestants or groups are paired against each other and perform a song of their choice. After each of the contestants or groups have performed their song the 101 voters decide who did better. The voting numbers are then revealed, but the contestants are not told which number is theirs. The host presents them with an offer of money. The contestants are asked if they think they have lost or won the battle. If they think they have lost, the contestant will press the button accepting the cash amount and being eliminated from the competition and the chance at the $1,000,000. The contestant with the highest number of votes, out of the three winners, automatically advances to the final round. In the second round, the two winners who did not receive the highest number of votes compete against each other. The contestants will again be offered a greater amount of money to walk away after the voting numbers are revealed. The winner of this round will go on to the final round. In the final round, the remaining two contestants will compete against each other. The voting numbers will be revealed again and they will be offered a higher amount of money than in the Second Round. The winner of the final round will continue on to compete for the $1,000,000 on the season finale.

Contestants

Preliminary rounds
 – The contestant won the round and continued in the competition.
 – The contestant won the $1,000,000 prize.
 – The contestant lost the round and was eliminated.
 – The contestant took the money offer and was eliminated.

Episode 1 (June 10, 2013)

Episode 2 (June 17, 2013)

1Leah Grace and Gina Wagner tied for first place at the end of Round 1. Therefore, the 101 voters were asked to vote for who they would like to see "fast tracked" to the final round. The 101 voters decided with a 59-42 vote that Leah Grace would be "fast tracked". As a result, Gina Wagner was forced to compete in Round 2.

Episode 3 (July 11, 2013)

Episode 4 (July 18, 2013)

Episode 5 (July 25, 2013)

Episode 6 (August 1, 2013)

Episode 7 – Finale (August 8, 2013)

Artists who appeared on previous shows

 Lakisha Jones competed on the sixth season of American Idol.  She finished in fourth place.
 Kai Kalama of the Kalama Brothers competed on the eighth season of American Idol.  He was eliminated in the Top 36.

U.S. Nielsen ratings

International versions

References

External links

2013 American television series debuts
2013 American television series endings
2010s American music television series
2010s American reality television series
English-language television shows
Music competitions in the United States
NBC original programming
Singing talent shows
Television series by Universal Television